Mindy Domb currently serves in the Massachusetts House of Representatives. Since 2019 she has represented the 3rd Hampshire district (includes Amherst, Pelham and Precinct 1 in Granby).
Immediately prior to being elected in 2019, she was the executive director of the Amherst Survival Center. where she oversaw the basic needs organization's roster of services, including a food pantry, fresh food distribution, food recovery program, community meals program, free health clinic, free community store, laundry facilities, showers and community space.

Political career
Domb ran for the position of State Representative in 2018. In 2019, she described her priorities as increasing investment in public higher education, addressing economic inequality and meeting basic needs, protecting the environment and responding to the climate emergency, increasing access to health care, protecting the rights of women, the LGBT community, workers, and immigrants, expanding public transit (public buses and rail), and increasing access to voting.

An article in a local blog, Western Mass Politics & Insight, described her experiences leading up to the decision to run for Masschusetts State Representative.

In the 2021-2022 legislative session, Domb serves as the Vice Chair of the Joint Committee on the Environment, Natural Resources & Agriculture (ENRA). She is also a member of the Joint Committee on Higher Education; the Joint Committee on COVID-19, Emergency Preparedness & Management; and the Joint Committee on Revenue.

She was also appointed to the Special Joint Oversight Committee established to make an investigation and study of the Soldiers’ Home in Holyoke COVID-19 outbreak. She is currently a Commissioner on The Ellen Story Commission on Postpartum Depression and a legislative member of the Non-Emergency Human Service Transportation Task Force.

Previously, Domb was elected and served as a member of Amherst Town Meeting for several terms.

See also
 2019–2020 Massachusetts legislature
 2021–2022 Massachusetts legislature

References

External links
 Legislative website
 Constituent services website
 Campaign website

Living people
Democratic Party members of the Massachusetts House of Representatives
21st-century American politicians
People from Hampshire County, Massachusetts
Barnard College alumni
Year of birth missing (living people)
Politicians from Amherst, Massachusetts
Women state legislators in Massachusetts
Teachers College, Columbia University alumni
21st-century American women politicians